The Curtiss HA (sometimes Dunkirk Fighter) was an American biplane seaplane designed by Captain B.L. Smith of the United States Marine Corps, and built by Curtiss Aeroplane and Motor Company.

Development and design
The HA was a two-seat biplane with a central float and balancing floats on the wingtips. The fuselage was wood with a fabric covering. The plane was powered by a Liberty 12 engine in the nose. The prototype was ordered in December 1917, and its first flight was on 21 March 1918. During testing the aircraft proved very unstable, with an overly heavy tailplane. The aircraft was destroyed in a crash.

Two more prototypes were ordered, designated HA-1 and HA-2. the HA-1 was constructed of salvaged parts from the original, but its tailplane and radiator were redesigned, and its wings were moved further aft. The HA-1 caught fire during a flight. The HA-2 had a wider wingspan, and performed better, but as the war was almost over, no production order was received.

Operational history
Three landplane versions were used as Mail planes.

Specifications (HA-2)

References

Notes

Bibliography
 

1910s United States fighter aircraft
HA
Single-engined tractor aircraft
Biplanes
Aircraft first flown in 1918